Wildwood Kin are an English contemporary family alt folk trio, composed of sisters Beth Key and Emillie Whiteside and their cousin Meghann Loney, from Exeter, Devon, England. They released their first album, Turning Tides, in August 2017. They released their self-titled second album in October 2019, featuring the smash hit "Beauty In Your Brokenness", a song inspired by the Japanese art of kintsugi. Wildwood Kin appeared on Channel 4's Sunday Brunch in September 2019.

Career
Before they officially formed as a band, Beth, Emillie, Meghann would harmonise to everything that was in earshot, from songs on the radio, TV jingles, adverts to even the doorbell. They soon found their signature style with Emillie playing guitar, Beth playing the bouzouki or keyboard, and Meghann playing the drums. They all join forces for harmonies and take turns on lead vocals. The band credit musical influences such as Simon & Garfunkel, Fleetwood Mac and James Taylor, as well as newer acts such as Mumford & Sons, Ben Howard, Fleet Foxes, Sigur Ros and The Civil Wars.

They played their first gig at an open mic night at Stokeinteignhead’s Church House Inn to around 60 people. This was where they caught the attention of their future management. Their career then developed quickly and in 2017 they released their debut album, Turning Tides, via Sony Music's imprint label Silvertone. The band spent much of 2017 touring playing a number of UK and European festivals over the summer, including an appearance with Seth Lakeman at Radio 2 Live in Hyde Park and on the BBC Music Introducing Stage at Glastonbury.

In describing the band, The Sunday Times noted "Fleetwood Mac-like harmonies, hints of Fleet Foxes’ desolate, spectral acoustica, echoes of Ben Howard’s richly textured but ramshackle sparseness, a love of Mumford-like propulsion and explosiveness."

In 2018, they performed their single "Steady My Heart" along with "Taking A Hold" on the one-off revival special of The Old Grey Whistle Test with Bob Harris.

In July, 2019 they announced their second, self-titled album, alongside lead single "Never Alone", written with and produced by Ed Harcourt. The rest of the album, produced by Ian Grimble, addresses profound themes like love, loss and spirituality. After a UK headline tour to support the album release, Wildwood Kin toured through Europe with the acclaimed indie rock-folk band Boy & Bear.

On 5th November 2022, they announced on their social media site that Meghann would be leaving the band to spend more time at home. Their final show together was on 17th December 2022, at Phoenix Hall in their home city of Exeter.

Discography

Albums

EPs

Singles

References

External links
 

English folk musical groups
Musical groups established in the 2010s
British musical trios